Maypole Airfield  was a general aviation airfield located  south of Herne Bay, Kent and  north east of Canterbury, Kent, United Kingdom. It was scheduled to close in January 2021, and is closed as of May 2021.

Accidents and incidents
 During October 2012 a small plane overshot the runway and crashed with no injuries.

 During WW2 - September 1940 a damaged hurricane made an emergency landing on this airstrip - No fatalities were recorded 
      
 Information via Ian F Blanthorn local East Kent historian.

See also
 List of airports in the United Kingdom and the British Crown Dependencies
 Hoath
 Maypole

References

External links

Airports in Kent